Antonio de los Ríos Rosas (16 March 1812, in Ronda, Spain – 3 November 1873, in Madrid, Spain) was a Spanish politician. 

A graduate of the University of Granada, he was elected three times President of the Congress of Deputies, the first time being in 1863.

Honours
Towards the end of his life he was elected a member of the Royal Spanish Academy.

References

Knights of the Golden Fleece
1812 births
1873 deaths
Members of the Royal Spanish Academy
Presidents of the Congress of Deputies (Spain)
People from Ronda
University of Granada alumni
Knights of the Golden Fleece of Spain